Valley Lee is an unincorporated community in St. Mary's County, Maryland, United States. The St. George's Episcopal Church was listed on the National Register of Historic Places in 1973.  Another landmark of Valley Lee is the 100-year-old Russells Store, a country store, barber/beautyshop, and local tavern.  The ZIP Code for Valley Lee is 20692.

References

Unincorporated communities in St. Mary's County, Maryland
Unincorporated communities in Maryland